John Mengatti (born September 21, 1954, in New York City) is an American actor primarily famous for his role as Nick Vitaglia, Salami's cousin, on the CBS television series The White Shadow.  Mengatti joined the cast midway through the second season and was a fan favorite with his distinctive New York-style accent. In 1982 he had guest appearances on The Facts of Life and CHiPs. In 1984, he appeared in Meatballs Part II.

After The White Shadow, Mengatti had sparse television and movie acting roles until 1986. He dropped out of acting for a while, but recently resurfaced on NYPD Blue in 2001 in a recurring role as Officer Howard.

He was in the movie Knights of the City, a 1986 action adventure film starring Leon Isaac Kennedy, Nicholas Campbell and Janine Turner. It was directed by Dominic Orlando and written by Leon Isaac Kennedy and filmed in Miami, Ft. Lauderdale and Hollywood, Florida.

Filmography

References

External links

New York Minute: John Mengatti joins The White Shadow (http://www.cultfilmfreaks.com/2012/12/johnmengatti.html)

1954 births
Living people
Male actors from New York City